Together Again is a collaborative album by pianist Emil Viklický and bassist George Mraz. Both these musicians are from the Czech Republic, but Mraz has lived in the US since the 1960s. Recorded at Realistic Sound Studio, it was produced by Siggi Loch and mixed by Klaus Scheuermann.

Track listing 
"Dear Lover"
"Poem"
"Theme From 5th Part of Sinfonietta"
"A Bird Flew By"
"U Dunaja u Prešpurka"
"Austerlitz"
"Moon, Sleeping in a Cradle"
"Thank You, Laca"
"Up on a Fir Tree"
"I Saw Grey Pidgeon"
"In Holomóc Town"

Personnel 
Emil Viklický: piano
George Mraz: acoustic bass

References 

2014 albums
Instrumental albums